The 2023 GB3 Championship is a planned motor racing championship for open wheel, formula racing cars held across Europe. The 2023 season will be the eighth organised by the British Racing Drivers' Club in the United Kingdom, and the third season under the GB3 moniker after rebranding from the BRDC British Formula 3 Championship in mid-2021. The championship will feature a mix of professional motor racing teams and privately funded drivers. The season is scheduled to be run over eight triple-header rounds and will start on 8 April at Oulton Park.

Teams and drivers 
All teams are British-registered.

Race calendar 
The provisional calendar was announced on 15 October 2022. For the first time in series history, two events will be held outside the United Kingdom. This also means that the GB3 Championship will become a FIA-certified international series.

Notes

References

External links 

 

BRDC British Formula 3 Championship seasons
GB3
GB3
GB3